Achille Variati (Vicenza, 19 January 1953) is an Italian politician and former Mayor of Vicenza.

A long-time member of Christian Democracy, he was elected to the municipal council of Vicenza in 1980 and then re-elected in 1985 and 1990, when he became city Mayor. After the disbandment of Christian Democracy, he joined the Italian People's Party and later Democracy is Freedom – The Daisy and the Democratic Party.

Elected to the Regional Council of Veneto in 1995, 2000 and 2005, he was President of the group of the Democratic Party since the beginning of 2007, almost eight months before the party was founded. He was elected Mayor of Vicenza in 2008 and re-elected in 2013.

References

Living people
1953 births
Democracy is Freedom – The Daisy politicians
21st-century Italian politicians
Italian People's Party (1994) politicians
Members of the Regional Council of Veneto
Mayors of Vicenza
Presidents of the Province of Vicenza